Lund is a locality situated in Gävle Municipality, Gävleborg County, Sweden with 444 inhabitants in 2010.

References 

Populated places in Gävle Municipality
Gästrikland